Georg Böhme (March 16, 1926 – July 1, 2016) was a German politician of the Christian Democratic Union (CDU) and former member of the German Bundestag.

Life 
Böhme joined the CDU in 1951. At the same time, he joined the Junge Union (JU) and had been chairman of the JU district association of Hildesheim since 1953. In 1958, he was elected deputy regional chairman of the Hannover JU.

Böhme was a member of the German Bundestag from 1961 to 1965. He was elected to parliament via the Lower Saxony state list.

Literature

References

1926 births
2016 deaths
Members of the Bundestag for Lower Saxony
Members of the Bundestag 1961–1965
Members of the Bundestag for the Christian Democratic Union of Germany